Statistics of Nemzeti Bajnokság I in the 1944 season.

Overview
It was contested by 12 teams, and the championship was unfinished, no winner was announced.

League standings

Results

References
Hungary - List of final tables (RSSSF)

Nemzeti Bajnokság I seasons
Hun
1943–44 in Hungarian football
Hun
1944–45 in Hungarian football